Hahncappsia corozalis is a moth in the family Crambidae. It is found in Panama, Costa Rica and Mexico (Veracruz, San Luis Potosí, Chiapas, Yucatán, Oaxaca, Morelos, Nayarit, Zacualpan).

The wingspan is 18–23 mm for males and 17–23 mm for females. Adults have been recorded on wing from April to November.

References

Moths described in 1967
Pyraustinae